Western Union Kerala State Football League is the 7th and final edition of the Kerala Football League (KFL). State Bank Travancore (SBT) won the Title and Central Excise Kochi become runners up.

Teams

Group A

Central Excise, Kochi, Kerala State Electricity Board (KSEB), State Bank of Travancore (SBT)

Group B

Titanium XI, Kochin Port Trust, Viva Kerala

Group A

Group B

Semifinals

Third Place

Final

References 

Football in Kerala